Sterile Island is a 3.68 ha island game reserve in south-eastern Australia.  It is part of the Actaeon Island Group, lying close to the south-eastern coast of Tasmania, at the southern entrance to the D'Entrecasteaux Channel between Bruny Island and the mainland.

Fauna
Recorded breeding seabird and wader species are the little penguin, Pacific gull and sooty oystercatcher.  European rabbits occur on the island.  The metallic skink is present.

References

Islands of Tasmania